This is a list of Passeriforme species by global population. While numbers are estimates, they have been made by the experts in their fields.

Passeriformes is the taxonomic order to which the perching birds belong.

Species by global population

See also
 
Lists of birds by population
Lists of organisms by population

References

Birds